The 2022 Paris–Roubaix was a road cycling one-day race that took place on 17 April 2022 in France. It was the 119th edition of Paris–Roubaix and the 15th event of the 2022 UCI World Tour. The race was won by Dutch rider Dylan van Baarle.

Result

References

Paris-Roubaix
Paris-Roubaix
Paris–Roubaix
Paris–Roubaix